King-Freeman-Speight House, also known as Francis Speight House, is a historic plantation house located at Republican, Bertie County, North Carolina. It was built in two sections, with the oldest built between 1808 and 1828. The older section forms the basis of the current rear wing. About 1828, a -story, Federal style, side-hall plan was added at a right angle to the original structure. The house was enlarged and remodeled in 1907. It has a two-story, two-bay addition and a two-story rear addition built in 1855. It features a hip roof front porch. Also on the property are the contributing two smokehouses, the kitchen, and an office. Noted landscape artist Francis Speight was born in the house in 1896.

It was added to the National Register of Historic Places in 1982.

References

Plantation houses in North Carolina
Houses on the National Register of Historic Places in North Carolina
Federal architecture in North Carolina
Houses completed in 1828
Houses in Bertie County, North Carolina
National Register of Historic Places in Bertie County, North Carolina
1828 establishments in North Carolina